Karl Nef (22 August 1873 – 9 February 1935) was a Swiss musicologist.

Life 
Born in St. Gallen, Nef first studied cello at the University of Music and Theatre Leipzig, but then turned to musicology under the influence of Hermann Kretzschmar. In 1896 his dissertation "Die Collegia Musica in der deutschen reformierten Schweiz von ihrer Entstehung bis zum Beginn des neunzehnten Jahrhunderts. With an introduction on the reformed  and the cultivation of profane music in Switzerland in the early days" at the Zollikofer'sche Buchdruckerei St. Gallen. In 1897, he moved to Basel, where he first worked as an editor for the Schweizer Musikzeitung and as a music consultant for the Basler Zeitung.

Nef died in Basel at the age of 61.

Work 
 
Die Stadtpfeiferei. Eine Skizze aus dem Musikleben der Vergangenheit, In: Schweizer Illustrierte, Bd. 7, 1903, . (Numerized) and (Numerized)

Further reading 
 Wilhelm Merian: Karl Nef und die Entstehung der Musikwissenschaft in Basel. In Basler Jahrbuch 1939, .

References

Weblinks 
 
 

Swiss musicologists
Academic staff of the University of Basel
1873 births
1935 deaths
People from St. Gallen (city)